Benjamin Ham Child (May 8, 1843 – May 16, 1902) was an American soldier who fought in the American Civil War. Child received the United States' highest award for bravery during combat, the Medal of Honor, for his action during the Battle of Antietam in Maryland on 17 September 1862. He was honored with the award on July 20, 1897.

Biography
Child was born in Providence, Rhode Island on May 8, 1843. He joined the 1st Rhode Island  Light Artillery in June 1861. After his Medal of Honor action, he was promoted to Sergeant, and wounded in the Battle of Gettysburg. He was commissioned as a Second Lieutenant in August 1863, and was discharged by special order from General George Meade after serving a total of 43 months.

In 1868, Child joined the Providence Police Department, and he was appointed as Chief of Police in 1881. He died on May 16, 1902 and his remains are interred at Swan Point Cemetery in Providence, Rhode Island.

Medal of Honor citation
Rank and organization: Corporal, Battery A, 1st Rhode Island Light Artillery. Place and date: At Antietam, Maryland, September 17, 1862. Date of issue: July 20, 1897.

Citation:

See also

List of American Civil War Medal of Honor recipients: A–F

References

1843 births
1902 deaths
People of Rhode Island in the American Civil War
Union Army officers
United States Army Medal of Honor recipients
American Civil War recipients of the Medal of Honor
People from Providence, Rhode Island
Burials at Swan Point Cemetery